The 2020 Women's Premiership (currently known as the ISPS Handa Women's Premiership for sponsorship reasons) was the eighteenth season of the league, New Zealand's top level women's football league since its establishment in 2002. Seven teams again were involved in the season representing the different regions in New Zealand. The league after consultation and feedback from stakeholders, was reverted to a single round-robin format, with the two highest-placed sides progressing to a one-off grand final. Canterbury United Pride was again the team to beat, as they were looking at a threepeat, having played in every final since 2013, won five our of seven of those finals, including the last two years.

After an unbeaten regular season, Canterbury United Pride capped it off by completing the threepeat, beating 2nd place Capital Football 4–0 in the final.

Teams

Regular season

League table

Positions by round

Auckland Football docked 9 points for fielding an ineligible player in their Round 1, 2 and 3 games against Central Football, Canterbury United Pride and Capital Football and the results recorded as 3–0 wins for the opposition.

Fixtures and results
New Zealand women's football league matches will take place from 31 October to 20 December with the draw reverting to a single-round robin competition with the top two teams progressing to the one-off final.

On the 11 December New Zealand Football announced Auckland Football had been docked 9 points for fielding an ineligible player in three of their ISPS Handa Women's Premiership games. The results from Round 1, 2 and 3 against Central Football, Canterbury United Pride and Capital Football were forfeited and results recorded as 3–0 wins for the opposition.

Round 1

Bye: WaiBOP 
*Auckland Football beat Central Football 9–1 however it was ruled by NZ Football that they had fielded an ineligible player so forfeited the result. This meant the win was awarded as a 3–0 result to Central

Round 2

Bye: Northern Lights
*Auckland Football beat Canterbury United Pride 4–1 however it was ruled by NZ Football that they had fielded an ineligible player so forfeited the result. This meant the win was awarded as a 3–0 result to Canterbury

Round 3

Bye: Central Football
*Auckland Football beat Capital Football 3–1 however it was ruled by NZ Football that they had fielded an ineligible player so forfeited the result. This meant the win was awarded as a 3–0 result to Capital

Round 4

Bye: Southern United

Round 5

Bye: Canterbury United Pride

Round 6 

Bye: Auckland Football

Round 7 

Bye: Capital Football

Final

Statistics

Top scorers

Hat-tricks

Own goals

References

External links
Official website 

2020
football
Women
Women
New Zealand, Women